John Sivebæk (born 25 October 1961) is a Danish former football defender. He won the 1984 Danish championship with Vejle Boldklub and played for English club Manchester United. He scored one goal in 87 appearances for the Danish national team, and represented his country at the 1986 World Cup as well as three European Championships, including the triumphant 1992 European Championship tournament.

Sivebæk has two sons, Christian Sivebæk the eldest of the sons, is also a professional football player.

Biography
Sivebæk was born in Vejle, and started his career with hometown club Vejle Boldklub in 1980. He was a part of the Vejle team that won the 1981 Danish Cup. He made his debut for the Danish national team in a May 1982 friendly match against Sweden. He was a part of the Danish squad at the 1984 European Championship, where he played in three of Denmark's four games.

He and Vejle won the 1984 Danish championship trophy, and he scored his only international goal, in a 1986 World Cup qualification game against the Republic of Ireland in November 1985. In the winter 1985, Sivebæk moved to England to play for Manchester United, joining fellow Dane Jesper Olsen. On 22 November 1986, he scored his first and only goal for Manchester United, a direct free-kick in a 1–0 home win against Queens Park Rangers, which was also the first Manchester United goal under newly hired manager Alex Ferguson. In his time at Manchester United, he was selected to represent Denmark at the 1986 World Cup, where he played two of Denmark's four games before elimination.

In 1987, Sivebæk was told he would not be a first team regular at Manchester United, and he moved to French club AS Saint-Étienne. While at Saint-Étienne, he was selected for the 1988 European Championship, where he played two of Denmark's three games. In 1991, he changed from Saint-Étienne to league rivals AS Monaco. While at Monaco, he was called up to the Danish squad for the 1992 European Championship. He played full-time in Denmark's first four games and helped the team reach the final against Germany. He took part in the final, but suffered an injury and was substituted in favour of Claus Christiansen, and watched from the bench as Denmark won 2–0. He ended his national team career later that year, following the 1994 World Cup qualification game against Northern Ireland in November 1992.

He went to Italy to play for Pescara Calcio in 1992. He moved back to Denmark in 1994, to play for childhood club Vejle BK. He played a single season for Vejle, for a total 226 games and 23 goals for the club. He ended his career with Danish club AGF Aarhus in 1997. After retiring, he became a football agent with Proactive Scandinavia.

Honours
1981 Danish Cup
1984 Danish championship
1992 European Championship

References

External links
Danish national team profile 
Vejle Boldklub profile 

A.S. Monaco Profile 

1961 births
Living people
AS Monaco FC players
AS Saint-Étienne players
Expatriate footballers in Monaco
Expatriate footballers in France
Ligue 1 players
Danish expatriate men's footballers
Danish expatriate sportspeople in Monaco
Danish expatriate sportspeople in France
Danish expatriate sportspeople in Italy
Danish expatriate sportspeople in England
Danish men's footballers
Denmark international footballers
Denmark under-21 international footballers
Association football defenders
Vejle Boldklub players
Manchester United F.C. players
Expatriate footballers in England
People from Vejle Municipality
Delfino Pescara 1936 players
Serie A players
Serie B players
English Football League players
Expatriate footballers in Italy
Aarhus Gymnastikforening players
Danish Superliga players
UEFA Euro 1984 players
1986 FIFA World Cup players
UEFA Euro 1988 players
UEFA Euro 1992 players
UEFA European Championship-winning players
Sportspeople from the Region of Southern Denmark